John C. Frémont (1813–1890) was an American explorer of the West during the 1840s and 1850s, popularly known as the Pathfinder, while serving in the U.S. military and as a private citizen. His first two published federal expeditions launched a mass emigration into the American West producing maps and reliable reports for settlers to read and follow. In the process of botanical nomenclature (plant naming), Frémont received many eponyms in his honor and for his work as a botanist. His genus name eponym is Fremontodendron, while his species eponym is fremontii. Frémont went on a total of five expeditions; the first three were federally sponsored while Frémont served as a military officer. On these expeditions he was guided by mountain man Kit Carson. Frémont's fourth and fifth expeditions were privately sponsored. Although Frémont's life was controversial, he was considered an American hero. Frémont's published works, co-authored by his wife Jessie, could either be read scientifically or as adventure stories, capturing the public's attention, and creating enthusiasm for Westward migration.

Scientific background, training, and education

In May 1829, Frémont entered Charleston College, where he studied, and taught at intervals in the countryside. Frémont, however, was expelled from the college for irregular attendance in 1831. Although Frémont did not graduate, he had been grounded in mathematics and natural sciences.  After his college dismissal, eminent South Carolina politician Joel R. Poinsett came to Frémont's aid, who secured him an appointment as a teacher of mathematics aboard the sloop USS Natchez.  Aided by Poinsett, Frémont was appointed to the U.S. Topographical Corps, surveying a route for the Charleston, Louisville, and Cincinnati railroad. When Poinsett became Secretary of War, he arranged for Frémont to assist notable French explorer and scientist Joseph Nicollet in exploring the lands between the Mississippi and Missouri rivers. In July 1838, Frémont was appointed second lieutenant in the U.S. Army Corps of Topographical Engineers, accompanying Nicollet on two successive expeditions, ending in 1839. Frémont gained valuable wilderness experience under Nicollet becoming a first rate topographer, trained in describing fauna, flora, soil, water resources, astronomy, and geological observation.

Plants named for
Frémont collected a number of plants on his expeditions, including the first recorded discovery of the Single-leaf Pinyon by a European American. The genus (Fremontodendron) of the California Flannelbush (Fremontodendron californicum) is named for him, as are the species names of many other plants, including the chaff bush eytelia (Amphipappus fremontii).

Other plants included:
 Western Rosinweed (Calycadenia fremontii)
 Goosefoot (Chenopodium fremontii)
 Moss Gentian (Gentiana fremontii)
 Bush Mallow (Malacothamnus fremontii)
 Mountain Ragwort (Senecio fremontii)
 Yellowray Gold (Syntrichopappus fremontii)
 Vernal Pool Goldfields (Lasthenia fremontii)

Gallery

References

Sources

 
 
 
 
 
 

Lists of things named after people
John C. Frémont